Aguacateros Club Deportivo Uruapan is a Mexican football club that plays in the Liga Premier de México. The club is based in Uruapan, Michoacán and was founded in 2018, after the merger between C.D. Uruapan and the Club Originales Aguacateros de Uruapan.

History

Origins
In 2015, C.D. Uruapan the team won the championship of Tercera División after defeating Sporting Canamy. The team competed for a season in Liga de Nuevos Talentos after failing to meet the requirements to promote to Liga Premier de Ascenso. With the federative seat of CDU Uruapan, another team called Titanes de Saltillo was created, finally, the CDU Uruapan returned to Tercera División.

Aguacateros C.D. Uruapan
In July 2018, the team was founded with the name Aguacateros Club Deportivo Uruapan after the merger of Club Deportivo Uruapan and the team Originales Aguacateros de Uruapan with the aim of creating a unified team that represents the city as well as looking for an economic saving, since instead of financing two clubs, it would be one. The new team occupied the federative position belonging to Originals Aguacateros, formed with players from both clubs and acquired the technical body of the CDU.

Meanwhile, the CDU franchise was rented to a group of entrepreneurs who created another team called Futcenter, which was based in Tlalnepantla de Baz, State of Mexico. This club used the CDU Uruapan name as a registration in the Mexican Football Federation, but it was completely separate from the Michoacán-based team. In 2019 this team was dissolved.

On June 28, 2019, the team was accepted as a new member of the Liga Premier de México – Serie B. In the 2020–21 season the team temporarily played in Liga Premier – Serie A due to the league holding a one-off tournament as a result of COVID-19.

In the 2021–22 season the team returned to Serie B, in that cycle the club won the two tournaments of the season for which it got its promotion in a sporting way to the Serie A.

Players

Current squad

Honours
 Serie B de México
 Winners: Apertura 2021, Clausura 2022

See also
Football in Mexico
Tercera División de México

External links
Tercera Divicion

References 

Association football clubs established in 2012
Football clubs in Michoacán
2012 establishments in Mexico
Liga Premier de México